The 2010 James Madison Dukes football team represents James Madison University in the 2010 NCAA Division I FCS football season. The Dukes were led by 12th year head coach Mickey Matthews in what proved to be a roller-coaster season. The Dukes made college football history when they knocked off in-state power #13 Virginia Tech, on the road, in front of over 66,000 fans. James Madison became the second FCS team to beat a nationally ranked FBS opponent since Appalachian State defeated #5 ranked Michigan in 2007. Not long after the victory of Virginia Tech the injuries began to mount up and paired with a difficult in-conference schedule. JMU finished the season 6–5 with nine of the eleven games decided by 7 points or less.

Schedule

References

James Madison
James Madison Dukes football seasons
James Madison Dukes football